Cornelius David Krieghoff (June 19, 1815 – March 5, 1872) was a Dutch-born Canadian-American painter of the 19th century. He is best known for his paintings of Canadian landscapes and outdoor life, which were as sought after in his own time as they are today. He painted many winter scenes, some in several variants (e.g. Running the Toll).

Life and career 
Krieghoff was born in Amsterdam, Kingdom of Holland. When Cornelius was a boy, his father Johann Ernst Krieghoff returned to Germany (Krieghoff was likely German extraction via Lorenz Krieghoff of Thuringia) and worked for Wilhem Sattler to establish a wallpaper factory. His family was given accommodations in Schloss Mainberg, a 12th-century castle owned by Sattler, situated overlooking the Main River. He was initially taught by his father and then entered the Academy of Fine Arts in Germany about 1830. He moved to New York in 1836, and enlisted in the First Regiment of Artillery in the United States Army in 1837. While in the army, he made sketches of the Second Seminole War. He was discharged as Corporal from the army in 1840. Krieghoff traveled to Paris in 1844, where he copied masterpieces at the Louvre under the direction of Michel Martin Drolling (1789–1851).

With his wife, Émilie Gauthier, he moved to Montreal around 1846 and participated in the Montreal Society of Artists in 1847. While in Montreal, he befriended the Mohawks living on the Kahnawake Indian Reservation and made many sketches of them from which he later produced oil paintings.

He and his family (daughter Emily) moved to Quebec City in 1853. He returned to Europe in 1854, visiting Italy and Germany. In 1855, he returned to Canada. He served for a short time in the Volunteer Militia Company of Engineers (a Canadian Militia unit in Hochelaga,  Montreal), then lived in Europe from 1863 to 1868 and moved to Chicago to retire. He died in Chicago on March 5, 1872, at the age of 56 and is buried in Graceland Cemetery in Chicago. A decade later, on June 8, 1881, the Great Quebec Fire destroyed many of the sketches he had done at the time of his service In the First Regiment of Artillery in Florida, which were owned at the time by John S. Budden, who had lived with the artist for thirteen years.

According to Charles C. Hill, the former Curator of Canadian Art at the National Gallery of Canada, "Krieghoff was the first Canadian artist to interpret in oils... the splendour of our waterfalls, and the hardships and daily life of people living on the edge of new frontiers".

The public collections holding works by Cornelius Krieghoff are the Art Gallery of Hamilton (Hamilton, Canada), the Art Gallery of Ontario (Toronto, Canada), the Beaverbrook Art Gallery (Fredericton, Canada), the Brooklyn Museum (New York City), the Glenbow Museum (Calgary, Canada), the McCord Museum (Montreal, Canada), the Montreal Museum of Fine Arts (Montreal, Canada), Musée national des beaux-arts du Québec (Quebec, Canada), the National Gallery of Canada (Ottawa, Canada), the New York Public Library (New York City), the Rockwell Museum (Corning, New York), the Winnipeg Art Gallery (Winnipeg, Canada) and the Art Gallery of Nova Scotia (Halifax, Canada).

Recognition 
In 1955, the National Film Board of Canada released the award-winning documentary The Jolifou Inn. The 10-minute film, directed by Colin Low and produced by Tom Daly, depicts 19th-century Québec life, as Krieghoff would have seen it, and uses his work to illustrate his source of inspiration.
 
On November 29, 1972, Canada Post issued 'Cornelius Krieghoff, painter, 1815–1872' designed by William Rueter based on a painting "The Blacksmith's Shop" (1871), by Cornelius Krieghoff in the Art Gallery of Ontario, Toronto, Ontario. The 8¢ stamps are perforated 11 and were printed by British American Bank Note Company.

On July 7, 2000, Canada Post issued 'The Artist at Niagara, 1858, Cornelius Krieghoff' in the Masterpieces of Canadian art series. The stamp was designed by Pierre-Yves Pelletier based on an oil painting  "The Artist at Niagara" (1858) by Cornelius Krieghoff in the Art Gallery of Ontario, Toronto, Ontario. The 95¢ stamps are perforated 13 x 13.5 mm and were printed by Ashton-Potter Limited.

Auction record 
The auction record for a painting by Cornelius Krieghoff is $570,000 Canadian.  This record was set by Mail boat landing at Quebec, a 17 by 24 inch oil painting on canvas sold November 20, 2006, at Sotheby's & Ritchies (Toronto).

Gallery

References

Bibliography 
 Barbeau, Charles Marius: Cornelius Krieghoff, Pioneer Painter of North America. The Macmillan Company of Canada, ltd., Toronto 1934.
 Barbeau, Charles Marius: Cornelius Krieghoff. Ryerson Press, Toronto 1948.
 Barbeau, Marius: Cornelius Krieghoff. Society for Art Publications, Toronto 1962.
 Harper, J. Russell: Cornelius Krieghoff, The Habitant Farm. National Gallery of Canada, Ottawa 1977.
 
 Jouvancourt, Hugues de: Cornelius Krieghoff. Musson Book Co., Toronto 1973.
 Ministère des affaires culturelles: Cornélius Krieghoff, 1815–1872. Québec 1971.
 .
 Vézina, Raymond: Cornelius Krieghoff, peintre de mœurs, 1815–1872. Éditions du Pélican, Québec 1972.
 Winkworth, Monsieur: Exposition d'estampes en l'honneur de C. Krieghoff, 1815–1872. McCord Museum, Montréal 1972.

External links 

 Biography at the Dictionary of Canadian Biography Online
 
 National Gallery of Canada
 Cornelius Krieghoff in ArtCyclopedia
 Smithsonian American Art Museum Art Inventories Catalog

1815 births
1872 deaths
19th-century Canadian painters
Canadian male painters
19th-century Dutch painters
Dutch male painters
Canadian landscape painters
Dutch expatriates in Canada
German expatriates in Canada
Painters from Amsterdam
Dutch emigrants to Canada
German emigrants to Canada
Burials at Graceland Cemetery (Chicago)
Persons of National Historic Significance (Canada)
19th-century Canadian male artists
19th-century Dutch male artists